The 3rd Florida Infantry Regiment was an infantry regiment that fought for the Confederacy in American Civil War. The regiment was formed in the summer of 1861 and served until it surrendered in 1865.

Organization
The 3rd Florida Infantry was formed near Pensacola, Florida, in July, 1861. Its companies were recruited in the counties of St. Johns, Hernando, Jefferson, Duval, Wakulla, Madison, Columbia, and Suwannee. The unit served along the coast at Talbot Island and Cedar Keys, then moved to Mobile. After fighting at Perryville it was assigned to Preston's, Stovall's, Finley's, J.A. Smith's Brigade, and during December, 1862, consolidated with the 1st Florida Infantry Regiment. It was organized with 950 officers and men, and the 1st and 3rd lost twenty-six percent of the 23 in action at Chickamauga. In December, 1863, this command totalled 240 men and 119 arms, but only a remnant surrendered in April, 1865. The field officers were Colonel William S. Dilworth; Lieutenant Colonels Lucius A. Church, Elisha Mashburn, and Arthur J.T. Wright; and Major John L. Phillips.

Companies

Service History
Much of the unit was armed with the Enfield rifle, which were supplied to the regiment late in March 1862. Around the same time, a portion of the regiment defeated a small U.S. naval force that was attempting to land near New Smyrna. Sometime in late-April, early-May 1862, the regiment was gifted a new battle-flag made by a group of women from Jefferson County. The flag had the motto “We Yield But in Death.” 

The 1st and 3rd were engaged at Murfreesboro and Jackson, then participated in the campaigns of the Army of Tennessee from Chickamauga to Bentonville.

Engagements and Battles
1862
New Smyrna (Companies E & H were involved)
Skirmish of the Brick Church
Kentucky Campaign
Battle of Perryville

1863
Battle of Murfreesboro
Vicksburg Campaign
Siege of Jackson
Battle of Chickamauga
Battles for Chattanooga

1864
Atlanta Campaign
Battle of New Hope Church
Battle of Atlanta
Battle of Ezra Church
Siege of Atlanta
Battle of Spring Hill
Battle of Franklin
Battle of Nashville

1865
Carolinas Campaign
Battle of Bentonville

See also
Florida Civil War Confederate Units

References

eHistory Archive
Civil War Soldiers and Sailor System

Units and formations of the Confederate States Army from Florida
1861 establishments in Florida